Animal Instinct is the title of the 1993 début release by instrumental rock guitarist Gary Hoey. The album featured his version of the hit "Hocus Pocus", originally done by 1970s Dutch progressive rock band Focus. His band at the time consisted of a few notable names of 1980s hard rock, including ex-The Firm bassist Tony Franklin, keyboardist Claude Schnell (ex-Dio), and drummer Frankie Banali (Quiet Riot).

Track listing
All songs written by Gary Hoey, except where noted.
Mass Hysteria 3:40
Animal Instinct 3:56
Hocus Pocus (Akkerman, Van Leer) 3:55
Bert's Lounge 4:57
Texas Son 3:56
Deep South Cafe (Hoey, Lori Weinhouse) 4:39
Motown Fever 3:01
Fade To Blue (Hoey, Weinhouse) 5:52
Drive 4:04
Jamie 2:20

Personnel
Jamie Kaplan: Vocal
Gary Hoey: Acoustic & Electric Guitars
Claude Schnell: Keyboards
Tony Franklin: Bass
Frankie Banali: Drums, Percussion

References

1993 debut albums
Gary Hoey albums
Warner Records albums
Reprise Records albums